Jenifer Wayne (1917–1982) (born Anne Jenifer Wayne) was a British author of children's literature. She graduated in 1936 from Somerville College, Oxford.
After leaving Oxford she worked on the staff of the B.B.C. as writer/producer.  In 1948 she married Cecil R. Hewitt (C. H. Rolph of the New Statesman) and became a freelance writer for Home and Overseas Services.   They had three children, the eldest of whom, Deborah, won a scholarship to Somerville.  They lived in a 16th century house in Surrey where they had a large garden, a field, a pony, 8 ducks and 2 hens.

Her books included the Sprout series, and The Day the Ceiling Fell Down and The Night the Rain Came In, which featured the same group of three children.

Her works have been translated into German, Dutch and Latvian.

References

Bibliography

External links
Guide
Another guide

1917 births
1982 deaths
British children's writers
Alumni of Somerville College, Oxford